The 1966 Washington Huskies football team was an American football team that represented the University of Washington during the 1966 NCAA University Division football season.  In its tenth season under head coach Jim Owens, the team compiled a 6–4 record, finished in fourth place in the Athletic Association of Western Universities, and outscored its opponents 171 to 141. The team captains were seniors Tom Greenlee and Mike Ryan.

In the season-ending  at Joe Albi Stadium  the Huskies defeated rival  for the eighth

Schedule

Roster

NFL/AFL Draft selections
Five University of Washington Huskies were selected in the 1967 NFL/AFL Draft, the first common draft, which lasted seventeen rounds with 445 selections.

References

External links
 Game program: Washington vs. Washington State at Spokane – November 19, 1966

Washington
Washington Huskies football seasons
Washington Huskies football